Jack Alban Quinn (11 June 1918 – 11 June 2006) was an Australian rules footballer who played with South Melbourne, Richmond and Melbourne in the Victorian Football League (VFL).

Quinn started out in the Melbourne Boys League, playing for St Kilda Under 18s, before joining the first of his three league clubs, South Melbourne. He roved for Richmond in the 1940 VFL Grand Final, which they lost. After four years out of the game, spent in the army, he returned for one final season in 1946, at Melbourne.

References

1918 births
2006 deaths
Australian rules footballers from Victoria (Australia)
Sydney Swans players
Richmond Football Club players
Melbourne Football Club players
Australian Army personnel of World War II
People from Echuca
Australian Army soldiers